Muḥammad al-Akhṣāṣī al-Muwaqqit was an Egyptian astronomer whose  and catalogue of stars,  ('Pearls of brilliance upon the solar operations'), was written at Cairo about 1650.
Al-Akhsasi was a shaykh, a learned elder, of the Grand Mosque of the university of Cairo, where his name al-Muwaqqit reflected his position regulating the times and hours at the mosque. His name Akhsasi connects him in origin to a village in the Faiyum, southwest of Cairo.

No copies of his book were known to Western astronomers or historians of science until 1895; thus he did not appear in the standard French and English bibliographies and library catalogues of the 19th century.

Notes

Medieval Egyptian astronomers